36 Guni Jodi is an Indian Marathi language drama series. It starred Aayush Sanjeev and Anushka Sarkate in lead roles. It is directed by Shashank Solanki under the banner of Seventh Sense Media. It premiered from 23 January 2023 on Zee Marathi by replacing Mazhi Tuzhi Reshimgath. It is an official remake of Telugu series Varudhini Parinayam.

Plot 
Vedant and Amulya are as different as chalk and cheese and always at loggerheads, but will opposites attract eventually?

Special episode (1 hour) 
 5 March 2023

Cast

Main 
 Aayush Sanjeev as Vedant Shridhar Wankhede
 Anushka Sarkate as Amulya Ashish Tumpalwar

Recurring 
Wankhede family
 Abhijeet Chavan as Shridhar Wankhede- Vedant's father
 Pradnya Jawale as Nutan Shridhar Wankhede- Vedant's mother
 Tejas Dongre as Vikrant Shridhar Wankhede- Vedant's brother
 Akshata Apte as Aadya Shridhar Wankhede- Vedant's sister and Sarthak's wife
 Sanyogita Bhave as Aaji- Vedant's grandmother

Tumpalwar family
 Rujuta Deshmukh as Suman Ashish Tumpalwar- Amulya's mother
 Avinash Narkar as Ashish (Anna) Tumpalwar- Amulya's father
 Sanjana Kale as Aarti Ashish Tumpalwar- Amulya's sister

Badwaik family
 Surabhi Bhave-Damle as Sumati Rajsingh Badwaik- Amulya's maternal aunt, Sarthak's mother
 Sagar Korade as Sarthak Rajsingh Badwaik- Amulya's cousin, Aadya's husband
 Vidisha Mhaskar as Sarika Rajsingh Badwaik- Sarthak's sister
 Milind Adhikari as Rajsingh Badwaik- Sarthak's father

Others
 Ruturaj Phadke as Gautam Prabhakar Ghorpade- Aarti's fiance
 Milind Shirole as Vijay- Vedant's P.A.
 Rucha Modak as Meena- Anna's clinic receptionist

Adaptations

References

External links 
 36 Guni Jodi at ZEE5
 

Marathi-language television shows
2023 Indian television series debuts
Zee Marathi original programming